Elks Building may refer to:

 Elks Building (Globe, Arizona)
 Elks Building (Stockton, California)
 Elks Building (Quincy, Massachusetts)
 Elks Building (Anaconda, Montana)
 Elks Building (Olympia, Washington)
 Elks Building (Vancouver, Washington)

See also 
 Elks Club Building (disambiguation)
 Elks Lodge Building (disambiguation)
 Elks (disambiguation)